Morad Tappeh (also Romanized as Morād Tappeh and Murād Tepe) is a village in Sehhatabad Rural District in the Central District of Eshtehard County, Alborz Province, Iran. At the 2006 census, its population was 470, in 138 families.

References 

Populated places in Eshtehard County